Maykon Daniel Elias Araújo (born 20 April 1984), known simply as Maykon, is a Brazilian former professional footballer who played as a left midfielder.

External links

1984 births
Living people
Sportspeople from Santa Catarina (state)
Brazilian footballers
Association football midfielders
Campeonato Brasileiro Série B players
Campeonato Brasileiro Série C players
Paulista Futebol Clube players
América Futebol Clube (MG) players
Atlético Clube Goianiense players
Sociedade Esportiva do Gama players
Primeira Liga players
C.F. Os Belenenses players
F.C. Paços de Ferreira players
U.D. Leiria players
Cypriot First Division players
AEL Limassol players
North American Soccer League players
Ottawa Fury FC players
Brazilian expatriate footballers
Expatriate footballers in Portugal
Expatriate footballers in Cyprus
Expatriate soccer players in Canada
Brazilian expatriate sportspeople in Portugal